is a Japanese manga series written and illustrated by Reiji Miyajima. It has been serialized in Kodansha's Weekly Shōnen Magazine since July 2017, and has been compiled into thirty volumes as of February 2023. The series is licensed in North America by Kodansha USA, which released the first volume in English in June 2020.

An anime television series adaptation produced by TMS Entertainment, aired from July to September 2020 on MBS's Super Animeism block. A second season aired from July to September 2022. A third season is set to premiere in July 2023. A live-action television drama adaptation also aired from July to September 2022.

Plot
Kazuya Kinoshita is dumped by his girlfriend Mami Nanami after dating for a month. He decides to use an online dating app to rent a girlfriend named Chizuru Mizuhara, a beautiful girl. However, because he thinks she was inauthentic, he gives her a low rating. When Chizuru berates him for that during their next meeting, he realizes she is meaner than he expected. Just then, Kazuya learns that his grandmother has been hospitalized following a collapse. Chizuru comes along and his grandmother is smitten with how great she is. Kazuya continues renting Chizuru in order to keep up appearances with his family and friends, but things get complicated when they discover they are next-door apartment neighbors and attend the same college. Later, other girls from the rental girlfriend business also join in.

Characters

Main

A 20-year-old college student who lives in Tokyo. Following a painful breakup with his girlfriend, Mami Nanami, he decides to rent a girlfriend named Chizuru Mizuhara. He soon finds himself in situations where he has to continue renting Chizuru to keep up appearances with his family and friends, and he eventually falls in love with her. Later on, he begins working part-time at a karaoke bar to pay for his dates and other expenses. 

A college student who moonlights as a rental girlfriend for the Diamond company. On campus, she goes under her real name , and utilizes a nerdy appearance with large dark-framed glasses and braided pigtails. It is later revealed that Chizuru and Kazuya are next-door neighbors in their apartment complex. She continues to let Kazuya rent her services in order to help his grandmother Nagomi, and to help him get over his breakup with Mami. 

Kazuya's former girlfriend. She has short blonde hair. She appears to be friendly on the outside but harbors jealous and possessive feelings that scare her friends sometimes. She is shocked and suspicious that Kazuya has found another girlfriend immediately after she dumped him. 

A girl who is introduced as Shun Kuribayashi's girlfriend. In actuality, she is also working as a rental girlfriend for another company. She wants to date Kazuya for real after seeing how kindly and passionately he treats Chizuru and her. She has a health condition where she has a low heart rate that she monitors, and Kazuya is the first guy who elevated it. Later on in the series, she quits her rental girlfriend job and starts working at the same karaoke bar as Kazuya.

A girl with pink hair who also works as a rental girlfriend with Chizuru's company. She is in her first year at college and is a newcomer to the industry. She has a shy personality and through Chizuru's urging, goes on dates with Kazuya in order to improve her skills as a rental girlfriend, later developing feelings for him. In her spin-off manga, Rent-A-(Really Shy!)-Girlfriend, it is revealed she decided to become a rental girlfriend due to a desire to pursue a career as an idol.

Supporting

Kazuya's paternal grandmother. She is thrilled to find out that Kazuya and Chizuru are a couple. She operates a family-owned liquor store with Kazuya's parents and is friends with Chizuru's grandmother.

Kazuya's father. He operates a family-owned liquor store with his mother and wife.

Kazuya's mother. She operates a family-owned liquor store with her husband and mother-in-law.

Kazuya's childhood friend and college schoolmate. He occasionally gives Kazuya advice about how to deal with his relationships. He also personally knows Kazuya's grandmother Nagomi, working part-time to help with her business.

 

Kazuya's friend and college schoolmate. He has short light hair and wears glasses. He often goes by "Kuri".

Chizuru's grandmother. In her heyday, Sayuri was an actress, inspiring Chizuru to become one herself. Sayuri and her late husband Katsuhito raised their granddaughter together after Chizuru's single mother died. 

Chizuru's friend and classmate in acting school. Kazuya mistakenly believes Umi is Chizuru's real boyfriend at first.

A girl who is a neighbor to both Kazuya and Chizuru. She is a social media influencer and into cosplay, and provides insight on crowdfunding to Kazuya when he and Chizuru decide to make an independent film together. She also encourages him to truly pursue Chizuru.

Media

Manga

Written and illustrated by Reiji Miyajima, the series began serialization in Kodansha's Weekly Shōnen Magazine on July 12, 2017. It has been compiled into thirty volumes as of February 2023. The series is licensed in North America by Kodansha USA, which released the first volume in English on June 2, 2020. Kodansha published an anthology of the series on August 17, 2020.

A spin-off manga series, titled , also written and illustrated by Miyajima, has been serialized in Kodansha's Magazine Pocket app since June 21, 2020. The series focuses on the character Sumi Sakurasawa. It has been compiled into three volumes as of May 2022. The series is also published in North America by Kodansha USA.

Anime

An anime television series adaptation was announced on December 15, 2019. The series was animated by TMS Entertainment and directed by Kazuomi Koga, with Mitsutaka Hirota handling series composition, Kanna Hirayama designing the characters, and Hyadain composing the music. The Peggies performed the opening theme . Halca performed the first ending theme  starting from Episodes 2–6 and 8–11, while Halca also performed the second ending theme "First Drop" for Episode 7, and Sora Amamiya performed the third ending theme  for Episode 12. It aired from July 11 to September 26, 2020, on the Super Animeism programming block on MBS and other networks. Season 1 ran for 12 episodes.

The series is licensed by Crunchyroll outside of Asia. On August 11, 2020, Crunchyroll announced that the series would receive an English dub, which premiered on August 28. In Southeast Asia and South Asia, the series is licensed by Muse Communication and released on the streaming service iQIYI in Southeast Asia. Animax later began airing the series.

On September 25, 2020, shortly before the first season's finale was streamed internationally, it was announced that a second season had been greenlit for production. The main cast and staff reprised their roles, with Studio Comet cooperating in the production. The second season aired from July 2 to September 17, 2022.

On May 18, 2021, it was announced Sentai Filmworks picked up the home video rights.

After the final episode of the second season, a third season was announced. It is set to premiere in July 2023, with Shinya Une replacing Kazuomi Koga as director.

Video game
A crossover smartphone game titled Kanojo, Okarishimasu Heroine All-Stars was developed by Enish. It featured Chizuru, Mami, Ruka, and Sumi along with female characters from other Weekly Shōnen Magazine manga series like Fairy Tail, The Seven Deadly Sins, Domestic Girlfriend, Girlfriend, Girlfriend, Fire Force, Yamada-kun and the Seven Witches, and Negima! Magister Negi Magi. It was released in September 2021. The game's service ended on January 25, 2023.

Drama
A live-action television drama adaptation aired on ABC and TV Asahi from July 3 to September 25, 2022. It stars Ryūsei Ōnishi and Hiyori Sakurada as Kazuya and Chizuru, respectively.

Reception
The series received a mixed to positive reception. Joe Ballard of Comic Book Resources (CBR) described the anime adaptation as a "hot mess" with sluggish pacing but also an "intriguing, action-packed rom-com and a semi-developing love story." Meanwhile, Ethan Wescoatt of CBR praised the story, which he called "mature" for a harem anime, in addition to the male and female leads, noting that Chizuru is an intriguing character due to hiding her true, multidimensional personality behind her perfect girlfriend façade and that Kazuya's struggles are relatable to the audience.

As of December 2021, the manga had over 10 million copies in circulation.

Notes

References

Works cited
 "Ch." is shortened form for chapter and refers to a chapter number of the Rent-A-Girlfriend manga as published by Kodansha USA.
 "Ep." is shortened form for episode and refers to an episode number of the Rent-A-Girlfriend anime as produced by TMS Entertainment.

Web sources

External links
  
  

2020s college television series
Anime series based on manga
Animeism
Crunchyroll anime
Fiction about social media
Harem anime and manga
Japanese webcomics
Kodansha manga
Muse Communication
Romantic comedy anime and manga
Sentai Filmworks
Shōnen manga
TMS Entertainment
Upcoming anime television series
Webcomics in print